Gerald O'Halloran (13 May 1902 – 6 January 1950) was a former Australian rules footballer who played with Carlton in the Victorian Football League (VFL).

He later worked for the Taxation Department and was also an accomplished saxophonist and flautist, playing in theatres in Melbourne and Sydney. He died at his home in Coburg on 6 January 1950.

Notes

External links 

Gerald O'Halloran's profile at Blueseum

1902 births
Carlton Football Club players
Australian rules footballers from Victoria (Australia)
Australian rules footballers from New South Wales
1950 deaths